Eletelba da Silva (born 21 October 1942), known as just Diogo, is a retired Brazilian professional soccer player.

Career
Born Eletelba da Silva, he began his career playing for Brazilian sides, America Futebol Clube (Rio de Janeiro), then Bonsucesso Futebol Clube (Rio de Janeiro) 1961. After playing on the development teams for each of these Rio de Janeiro clubs, he signed his first professional contract with Desportiva Ferroviaria (Cariacica, Espirito Santo) (1961-1966). He then went on to play for Prudentina, from (1966-1967) S.E. Palmeiras (1967-1968), Portuguesa and C.R. Flamengo (1968-1969), before continuing his career playing for then Mexico City side, Club de Futbol Atlante (1970-1971).
After playing for C.F. Atlante, he continued his playing career in the newly formed North American Soccer League.  In 1972, he was contracted to play for the Miami Gatos.  After, spending the 1973-1974 season with the Cincinnati Comets, he spend his final two seasons 1975-1976 playing with the Chicago Cats.

References

Brazilian footballers
Brazilian expatriate footballers
Desportiva Ferroviária players
CR Flamengo footballers
Sociedade Esportiva Palmeiras players
Miami Toros players
North American Soccer League (1968–1984) players
Expatriate soccer players in the United States
American Soccer League (1933–1983) players
Cincinnati Comets players
Chicago Cats players
Association football midfielders
1942 births
Living people